Martijn Joop Krabbé (born 26 March 1968) is a Dutch radio and television presenter.

Career
Krabbé started his career in Dutch media as a 19-year-old in the Dutch TV programme "Popformule". Later, he hosted several Dutch television programmes, such as Idols (the Dutch version of Pop Idol).
He also hosted the Dutch version of The X Factor and Dancing on Ice.

Currently, he is known for hosting The Voice of Holland, where contestants are judged only by the quality of their voice (the judges never see the contestant until they believe in "The Voice").

Shows

 Popformule (1987)
 Ministars (1991)
 Power Play (1992-1993)
 Postcode Loterij Recordshow (1995-1998)
 In Holland staat een Huis (1999-2006)
 In Holland ligt een Tuin (2001)
 Kiezen of Delen (2000-2001)
 Win een Sponsor (2000)
 Big Brother 4 (2002)
 De perfecte partner
 Idols (2006-2008)
 Dancing on Ice (2006-2007)
 Wie wordt de man van Froukje? (2007)
 Mijn Tent is Top finale (2008, 2009)
 Wie is de Chef? (2008-2009)
 Uitstel van Executie (2008-2011)
 Postcode Loterij Wat Schat Je? (2008)
 The X Factor (2009–2013)
 Topchef (2009-2010)
 Topchef Vips (2009)
 De slimste (2009)
 The Voice of Holland (2010–present)
 Hotel de Toekomst (2011–present)
 Krabbé staat op Straat (2011–present)
 The Voice Kids (2012–2021)

Personal life
His father is actor and director Jeroen Krabbé. He was married twice to Amanda Beekman; from 1995 to 1999 and from 2005 to 2014. They have two sons and two daughters. He is a nephew of Tim Krabbé.

References

External links

1968 births
Dutch radio personalities
Dutch television presenters
Living people
Mass media people from Amsterdam
20th-century Dutch people
21st-century Dutch people